Edward Kellogg (October 18, 1790 in Norwalk, Connecticut – April 29, 1858 in New York) was a businessman and economist. Influenced by his experience in the Panic of 1837, he became an early advocate of fiat money. His ideas later influenced the Greenback movement and the Populist Party.

Life and career
After a brief stint in business in Norwalk, he relocated to New York City and established Edward Kellogg & Co., a wholesale dry goods firm, which he operated until 1837. By that time, he was heavily invested in real estate in Brooklyn and moved his family there to facilitate the management of his properties. This, together with his financial studies, would occupy most of his time for the remainder of his life.

Economic ideas 
Following the Panic of 1837, he began to think about the monetary system and what he believed its faults were.  He was especially concerned about interest, which could often reach usurious levels. His first proposal was that all paper money should be issued by the government.  (At that time, most banks issued their own private paper notes.)  The government's notes would be low interest and backed by real estate.  Simultaneously, the government would issue bonds (at the same interest rate) that could be exchanged for the notes.  This, he believed, would keep interest rates tied to actual economic growth. The notes could also be redeemed for gold or silver, twice yearly, and would be insured by a National Safety Fund.

In 1843 Horace Greeley, editor of the New York Tribune, convinced Kellogg to publish his opinions. They were issued in tabloid form under the title "Usury: the Evil and Remedy". With a few additions and changes, it was reprinted the next year as a pamphlet, under the pseudonym Godek Gardwell, and renamed "Currency: the Evil and Remedy". In 1849, it was given the title "Labor and Other Capital" and published as a book. His daughter put out a new edition in 1861 and it was retitled again, as "A New Monetary System",

Influence on later movements 

During his own lifetime, Kellogg's ideas garnered interest from Greeley and some other public figures, but they never came close to being adopted. Kellogg's proposals gained new attention during the American Civil War, when the United States began printing banknotes as a matter of wartime necessity. After the war, Alexander Campbell adopted aspects of Kellogg's proposals, calling for the permanent usage of fiat money. Campbell's approach served as the intellectual basis for the rise of the Greenback movement and would later influence the Populist Party.

Bibliography

Labor and Other Capital, reissued (1971) by A. M. Kelley,

References

External links 
 Letter from "Godek Gardwell" urging editor Freeman Hunt to publish his writings in the Merchants' Magazine.

1790 births
1858 deaths
People from Norwalk, Connecticut
Economists from Connecticut
19th-century American businesspeople